The Wassaic Project is a non-profit artist-run arts, community and art education space in Wassaic, New York founded in 2008 that hosts festivals, community events and year-round artist residencies. Currently it consists of a year-round competitive residency program and summer arts programming which culminate in a large, free summer festival (usually in August).

History 
Co-founders Bowie Zunino and Eve Biddle had done community organizing in Providence, Rhode Island. Zunino's father, an architect and developer of historic sites like South Street Seaport, had just finished preserving the Maxon Mills, with a wood crib elevator, in the hamlet of Wassaic, New York, near where he owned a house. The artists and friends Zunino and Biddle, alongside cofounders Jeff Barnett-Winsby and Elan Bogarin, opened a gallery space in the mill in 2008 and began an art happening there focused on community and contemporary art. They began restoring buildings in the hamlet and expanded with other events like a haunted house and then added their current artist in residence program.

The project
The organization makes use of restored historic buildings in the hamlet of Wassaic, including Maxon Mills and Luther Barn. Maxon Mills, a seven-story former wood crib grain elevator, has been converted into exhibition, office, and studio spaces, including Art NEST, a free drop-in creative space for kids.  Luther Barn is home to artist-in-residence studios and the old cattle auction ring is used as a film exhibition space during the summer festival. The organization currently offers year-round programming as well as an education program focused onsite and at the Webutuck consolidated school district serving the Towns of Amenia and Northeast.

The Wassaic Project hosts an annual Summer Festival, outdoors and in their Mill building. Their Mill building has an exhibition space open to the public that has shown work by Colin Williams, Margeaux Walter, Minhee Bae, Tatiana Arocha, Eleanor Sabin, Ghost of a Dream and Doug and Mike Starn. And their artist in residence program alumni include Sean Fader, Manuel H. Márquez, Hillerbrand + Magsamen, Hunter Creel, Goldie Poblador   The project hosts other community events that bring thousands of visitors like their August Festival for dance performances, their annual haunted house and overnight bonfires.

The Wassaic Project also has an invitational print Editions Program where they pair a contemporary artist with a master printer to produce an edition in their studio. Artists in this program have included William Powhida, Lisa Iglesias, Kenya (Robinson) and Amanda Valdez among many.

References

External links

American artist groups and collectives
Arts organizations based in New York (state)
Amenia, New York
Artist colonies
Arts organizations established in 2008
2008 establishments in New York (state)